Deuterosaurus is an extinct genus of dinocephalian therapsids, one of the non-mammalian synapsids dominating the land during the late Paleozoic.

Anatomy
 
Skulls of Deuterosaurus are well known from several finds. They were around 80 cm long (2 ft 6 in) with a long snout and conical teeth. Like all anteosaurs, the skull possessed long, dagger-like canine teeth. The skull was rather short for an anteosaur, with a broad cheek region, indicating a very strong bite. The eyes were partly slanted forward, giving it at least partial stereo vision. The pineal eye, though small, had a well formed opening right atop the brain case.

Deuterosaurus was a very large animal, the size of a modern grizzly bear. T. H. Huxley mistakenly considered it to be a dinosaur. With its long tail, it had an adult length of 5–6 meters (15–18 ft) and weighted around half a ton. Judging from related therapsids, the short but massive legs were held splayed, much like a modern crocodile. When walking, the tail would have swung sideways, like in modern reptiles.

Biology
Deuterosaurus is found in what is now Siberia, which in the Permian was dominated by temperate lowlands. Deuterosaurus was among the largest animals of its day, and has variously been interpreted as a herbivore or carnivore. While the large canines may indicate the ability to kill prey, the short legs and massive body would have made it unsuited as a long distance runner, and better suited to eating plants. Then again, the possible stereoscopic vision again indicates an ambush style carnivore, and the rather blunt, cone-like post canine teeth can be interpreted both ways. Possibly Deuterosaurus was omnivorous, like a modern bear.

Deuterosaurus, like all its therapsid cousins, probably laid eggs. A remarkable thickening of the skull above the eyes indicates it may have engaged in head-butting, possibly in connection with mating or territorial disputes.

See also
 List of therapsids

References

Palæos
Brithopodidae/Anteosauridae 
Permian-Triassic extinctions

Tapinocephalians
Prehistoric therapsid genera
Permian synapsids of Asia
Guadalupian synapsids
Fossil taxa described in 1860
Taxa named by Karl Eichwald
Capitanian genus first appearances
Capitanian genus extinctions